Masanaga (written: , ,  or ) is a masculine Japanese given name. Notable people with the name include:

, Japanese daimyō
, Japanese footballer and manager
, Japanese daimyō
, Japanese samurai and daimyō
, Japanese daimyō

Japanese masculine given names